The Royal Maritime Auxiliary Service (RMAS) was a British Government agency which ran a variety of auxiliary vessels for His Majesty's Naval Service (incl. Royal Navy, Royal Marines) and the Royal Fleet Auxiliary. The service from 2009 has been run by Serco and is known as Serco Marine Services.

Background
The Royal Maritime Auxiliary Service merged with the former Port Auxiliary Service in 1976 to form a component of His Majesty's Naval Service that was known as marine services. Marine services existed to support the operations of the Royal Navy, Royal Marines and Royal Fleet Auxiliary.

In the 1990s, marine services were put out to commercial tender by the Ministry of Defence Warship Support Agency (now absorbed into the Defence Equipment and Support organisation) and by 1996, all tugs, lifting craft, various tenders and management of HMNB Devonport, Portsmouth and Clyde were operated by Serco Denholm.

By the mid 2000s, it was decided that the Royal Maritime Auxiliary Service would no longer provide marine services to HM Naval Service, and it would instead be delivered under a Private Finance Initiative instead. Serco were quickly declared preferred bidders and the RMAS was disbanded on 31 March 2008.

Vessels
RMAS vessels carried the ship prefix "RMAS" and auxiliary (A) or yard (Y) pennant numbers. They also had a distinctive livery or colour-scheme, namely: black hulls with white beading and buff-coloured upperworks. Below is a list of vessels previously operated by the Royal Maritime Auxiliary Service. A number of the vessels listed below were later transferred over to Serco Marine Services who continue to provide marine services in support of the Royal Navy.

Research vessels

 RMAS Newton (A367)
 RMAS Colonel Templer (A229)
Ammunition transport
 RMAS Kinterbury (A378)
 RMAS Throsk (A379)
 RMAS Arrochar
Sal-class salvage vessels

 RMAS Salmoor (A185)
 RMAS Salmaster (A186)
 RMAS Salmaid (A187)
Moor-class salvage vessels
 RMAS Moorhen (Y32)
 RMAS Moorfowl (Y33)
 RMAS Cameron (A72)
Tornado-class torpedo retrievers
 RMAS Tornado (A140)
 RMAS Torch (A141)
 RMAS Tormentor (A142)
 RMAS Toreador (A143)
Torrent-class torpedo retrievers
 RMAS Torrent (A127)
Impulse-class submarine berthing tugs
 RMAS Impulse (A344)
 RMAS Impetus (A335)
Adept-class tractor tugs

 RMAS Adept (A224)
 RMAS Bustler (A225)
 RMAS Capable (A226)
 RMAS Careful (A227)
 RMAS Forceful (A221)
 RMAS Nimble (A222)
 RMAS Powerful (A223)
 RMAS Faithful (A228)
 RMAS Dexterous (A231)
Moorings/Range tender
 RMAS Warden (A368)
Fast fleet tender/VIP carrier
 RMAS Adamant (A232)
Aberdovey-class fleet tenders

 RMAS Aberdovey (Y10)
 RMAS Abinger (Y11)
 RMAS Alness (Y12)
 RMAS Alnmouth (Y13)
 RMAS Appleby (A383)
 RMAS Ashcott (Y16)
 RMAS Beaulieu (A99)
 RMAS Beddgelert (A100)
 RMAS Bembridge (A101)
 RMAS Bibury (A103)
 RMAS Blakeney (A104)
 RMAS Brodick (A105)
 RMAS Cartmel (A350)
 RMAS Cawsand (A351)
Clovelly-class fleet tenders

 RMAS Clovelly (A389)
 RMAS Criccieth (A391)
 RMAS Cricklade (A381)
 RMAS Cromarty (A488)
 RMAS Denmead (A363)
 RMAS Dornoch (A490)
 RMAS Dunster (A393)
 RMAS Elkstone (A353)
 RMAS Elsing (A277)
 RMAS Epworth (A355)
 RMAS Ettrick (A274)
 RMAS Felsted (A348)
 RMAS Fintry (A394)
 RMAS Fotherby (A341)
 RMAS Froxfield (A354)
 RMAS Fulbeck (A365)
 RMAS Glencoe (A392)
 RMAS Grasmere (A402)
 RMAS Hambledon (A1769)
 RMAS Harlech (A1768)
 RMAS Headcorn (A1766)
 RMAS Hever (A1767)
 RMAS Holmwood (A1772)
 RMAS Horning (A1773)
 RMAS Lamlash (A208)
 RMAS Lechlade (A211)
 RMAS Llandovery (A207)
 RMAS Lydford (A251/A510)
 RMAS Meon (A87)
 RMAS Milford (A91)
 RMAS Melton (A83)
 RMAS Menai (A84)
Ilchester-class dive tenders

 RMAS Ilchester (A308)
 RMAS Instow (A309)
 RMAS Invergordon (A311)
 RMAS Ironbridge (A310)
 RMAS Ixworth (A318)
Manly-class fleet tenders

 RMAS Manly (A92)
 RMAS Mentor (A94)
 RMAS Messina (A107)
 RMAS Milbrook (A97)
Magnet class degaussing vessels
 RMAS Magnet (A114)
 RMAS Lodestone (A115)

See also
Admiralty Yard Craft Service
Royal Fleet Auxiliary
Serco Marine Services
List of ships of Serco Denholm Marine Services

Notes and references

Further reading

External links

RMAS Gallery

 
Royal Navy
Government agencies disestablished in 2008